This is a list of works by Bhaktisiddhanta Sarasvati (1874-1937), a Gaudiya Vaishnava leader and religious reformer. This list includes his original works, commentaries on canonical Vaishnava texts, and articles in periodicals Sajjana-toshani and the Gaudiya.

Original works by Bhaktisiddhanta 

 Prahlāda-caritra (The Life and Deeds of Prahlāda) five chapters in Bengali verse, 1886 (it is most probably lost) 
 Baṅge Sāmājikatā: varna o dharmagata samāja (Sociality in Bengal: Varna and Dharmic Society), 1899 
 Brāhmaṇa o vaiṣṇavera tāratamya-viśayaka siddhānta (Comparative Conclusions Concerning Brāhmanas and Vaisnavas), 1911, revised and enlarged in 1934 
 Bhaktibhāvana-pañjikā, Navadvīpa-pañjikā (1914) (The Bhaktibhavana Almanac, The Navadvīpa Almanac) with dates for religious festivals and for ritually important events 
 Vaiṣṇava-mañjusā-samāhṛti (A basket of collected definitions about Vaishnavism), Vaishnava encyclopedia in four volumes, 1922–1925 
 A Few Words on Vedānta, 1932
 Rai Rāmānanda, 1932 (English)
 Relative Worlds, 1932
 The Vedānta: Its Morphology and Ontology, 1932

Books on astronomy (jyotiṣa)

Published between 1896 and 1914 

 Ārya-siddhānta by Āryabhaṭa (sixth century), co-edited by K. Dutt 
 Bhauma-siddhānta, mathematical calculations compared to those of Western astronomy, co-edited by K. Dutt
 Translation of Jyotiṣa-tattvam by Raghunandana Bhaṭṭācārya
 Ravicandrasāyanaspaṣṭha, annotations by Bhaṭṭotpala (tenth century); mathematical calculations compared to those of Western astronomy
 Sūrya-siddhānta, Purva and Uttara sections; translation from Sanskrit to Bengali and annotations by Bhaktisiddhānta

Published in the magazines Bṛhaspati and Jyotirvida 

 Bhata-dīpikā-ṭīkā by Paramadīśvara, co-edited by K. Dutt 
 Camatkāra-cintāmaṇi by Paramadīśvara, co-edited by K. Dutt, translation by Kunjavihāri Jyotirbhuṣaṇa
 Dina-kaumudī by Paramadīśvara, co-edited by K. Dutt
 Laghu-jātaka, annotations by Bhaṭṭotpala (tenth century)
 Laghuparāśarīya or Udūdaya-pradīpā, annotations by Bhairava Datta, co-edited by K. Dutt
 Siddhānta-śiromaṇi, Golādhyāya (in Bṛhaspati) and Grahaganitādhyaya (in Jotirvida) with Vāsanā commentary (bhāṣya) by Bhāskarācārya (twelfth century); translation in Bengali and annotations by Bhaktisiddhānta

Canonical works published with a commentary by Bhaktisiddhānta 
 Upadeśāmṛta, by Rūpa Gosvāmī, with translation and a commentary called Anuvṛtti, 1914 
 Caitanya-caritāmṛta, by Kṛṣṇadāsa Kavirāja Gosvāmī, with a commentary called Anubhāsya, 1915 
 Śrīmad-bhāgavatam, with commentary, 1923–1935
 Bhakti-sandarbha, by Jīva Gosvāmī, with Bengali translation and a commentary called Gaudīya-bhāṣya, only the initial portion, 1924–1933
 Prameya-ratnāvalī, by Baladeva Vidyābhūśaṇa, with a commentary called Gauḍīya-bhāṣya, 1924
 Śrī Caitanya-bhāgavata, by Vṛndāvana dāsa Ṭhākura, first edition, 1924, second edition with a commentary called Gauḍīya-bhāṣya, 1932
 Śrī Caitanya-candrāmṛta and Śrī Navadvīpa-śataka by Prabodhānanda Sarasvatī, with translation and a commentary called Gaudīya-bhāṣya, 1926 
 Śrī Brahma-saṁhitā, chapter 5 with commentary by Jīva Gosvāmī; translation and paraphrase of that commentary in English by Bhaktisiddhānta, 1932 
 Īśopaniṣad

Unpublished works 
 The commentary (Anubhāsyam) on the Vedānta-sūtra by Madhva 
 Sarasvatī-jayaśrī, a volume called Śrī-parva, recently recovered 
 Diary 1904–1936, recently recovered

Books written or edited by Bhaktivinoda and published by Bhaktisiddhānta 
 Amṛta-pravāha-bhāṣya (The Flow of Nectarine Commentaries), a commentary on the Caitanya-caritāmṛta 
 Arcana-kaṇa (A Drop of Image Worship)
 Arcana-paddhati (The Ritual Manual for Image Worship)
 Bhagavad-gītā, with translation and commentary (Rasika-rañjana) 
 Bhakti-ratnākara, published posthumously
 Bhajana-rahasya (The Secret of Bhajana) 
 Gītā-mālā (A Garland of Songs)
 Gītāvalī (A Wave of Songs)
 Hari-nāma-cintāmaṇi (The Touchstone of the Names of Hari)
 Kalyāna-kalpataru (The Auspicious Wish-Fulfilling Tree)
 Jaiva Dharma (The Dharma of Jīvas)
 Life and Precepts of Shree Chaitanya Mahaprabhu
 Sanmodana-bhāṣya (Highly Delightful Commentaries) a commentary on the Śiksāstaka by Śri Caitanya
 Śaranāgati (The Path of Surrender) (Bengali, English, Tamil)
 Śrī Caitanya-śiksāmṛta (The Nectarian Teachings of Śri Caitanya) (Bengali, English, Telugu) 
 Śrī Caitanyopaniṣad
 Śrī Navadvīpa-dhāma-māhātmya (The Sublimity of the Holy Place of Navadvīpa) 
 Śrī Navadvīpa-dhāma-granthamāla (The Garland of Texts about the Holy Place of Navadvīpa)
 Tattva-muktāvalī (A Pearl Necklace of Truths)
 Tattva-sūtra (Sūtras about the Truth) (in Devanāgarī script) 
 Tattva-viveka (Truth of Knowledge about Reality)
 The Bhāgavat: Its Philosophy and Theology

Canonical works by other authors published by Bhaktisiddhānta 
 Gaura-kṛṣṇodaya (The Advent of Gaura Kṛṣṇa) by Govinda Dāsa, 1914 
 Mani-mañjarī (The Budding Crest Jewel) by Nārāyaṇa Paṇḍita with translation, 1926 
 Vedānta-tattva-sāra (The Essential Truths of the Vedanta) by Rāmānujācārya with translation, 1926
 Prema-bhakti-candrikā (The Moonlight of Pure Devotional Love) by Narottama Dāsa, 1927
 Sadācāra-smṛti (The Smrti Text of Proper Conduct) by Madhva with translation, 1927 
 Hari-nāmāmṛta-vyākaraṇa (The Grammar of the Nectarine Names of Hari) by Jīva Gosvāmī, 1928
 Hari-bhakti-kalpa-latikā (The Wish-Fulfilling Creepers of Devotion to Hari) with translation (author unknown), second edition with Bengali translation, 1931 
 Prema-vivarta (The Transformation of Pure Love) by Jagadānanda Paṇḍita 
 Sat-kriyā-sāra-dīpikā (The Lamp and Essence of Proper Rituals) by Gopāla Bhaṭṭa Gosvāmī
 Saṁskāra-dīpikā (The Lamp of Purificatory Rituals) 
 Śrī Caitanya-maṅgala by Locana Dāsa Ṭhākura

Articles in the Sajjana-toṣaṇī

1897 
 Sanskṛt-bhaktamāla, a review of the Sanskrit text Bhaktamāla

1899 
 Śrīman Nāthamuni (Nāthamuni) 
 Yāmunācārya (Yāmunācārya)
 Śrī Rāmānujācārya (Rāmānuja)

1915–16 
 Pūrva-bhāṣā (Introductory Words)
 Prānīra prati dayā (Compassion Toward Living Beings)
 Śrī Madhvamuni-carita (The Life and Works of Madhva Muni)
 Ṭhākurera smṛti-samiti (The Memorial Assembly for Bhaktivinoda Ṭhākura) 
 Divyasūri vā Ālvāra (Divyasūri or Ālvāra, saint in Rāmānuja’s sampradāya)  
 Jayatīrtha (Jayatīrtha) 
 Godādevī (Godādevī) 
 Pāñcarātrika adhikāra (Qualification According to the Pāñcarātrika System)  
 Prāpti svīkāra (Letter of Acknowledgment of Receipt) 
 Vaiṣṇava smṛti (The Smṛti Texts of the Vaishnavas)  
 Śrī patrikāra kathā (The Message of the Magazine)  
 Bhaktāṅghri-renu (The Dust of the Feet of Bhaktas) 
 Kulaśekhara (Kulaśekhara) 
 Sāmayik prasaṅga (Concerning Current Events) 
 Śrī Gaurāṅga, philosophical topics concerning Sri Gaurāṅga (Caitanya)  
 Abhakti-mārga (The Path of Nonbhakti)  
 Viṣṇu citta (Vishnu Citta) 
 Pratikūla matavāda (Unfavorable Philosophies) 
 Mahātmā Śrīla Kṛṣṇadāsa (The Great Soul Kṛṣṇadāsa Kavirāja)  
 Toṣaṇīra kathā (The Message of Sajjana-toṣaṇī) 
 Śrī guru svarūpa (The Real Identity of the Guru) 
 Prabodhānanda (Prabodhānanda) 
 Śrī bhakti-mārga (The Path of Bhakti) 
 Samālocanā (Critical Review) 
 Toṣaṇī-prasaṅga (Regarding the Sajjana-toṣaṇī) 
 Artha o anartha (Wealth and Worthlessness) 
 Baddha, tatasthā o mukta (The Bound, the Marginal, and the Liberated)  
 Gohite pūrvādeśa (Previous Instructions about the Welfare of the Cows)  
 Prākṛta o aprākṛta (Material and Nonmaterial) 
 Antardvīpa (an article about the island of Antardvīpa in Nabadwip)  
 Prakata-pūrnimā (The Full-Moon Night of Appearance) 
 Caitanyābda (The Era Beginning with Caitanya) 
 Upakurvāna (Time-Limited Celibacy) 
 Varṣa-śesa (The End of the Year)

1916–17 
 Nava-varṣa (New Year)
 Āsaner kathā (The Message of the Āsana)
 Ācārya-santāna (Descendants of the Ācāryas)
 Videśe gaura-kathā (The Message of Gaura Abroad)
 Samālocanā (Critical Review)
 Āmāra prabhura kathā (Topics about My Master), about Gaura Kiśora dāsa Bābājī
 Vaiṣṇavera viśaya (The Material Possessions of a Vaishnava)
 Guru-svarūpe punah praśna (Another Question about the True Identity of a Guru)
 Vaiṣṇava-vaṁśa (The Lineage of the Vaishnavas)
 Viraha-mahotsava (The Great Festival of Separation)
 Śrī patrikāra ukti (Statements of the Magazine) 
 Prākṛta-rasa-śata-dūṣanī (The Hundred Flaws of Materialistic Rasa) 
 Duiti ullekha (Two Mentioned Things) 
 Gānera adhikārī ke? (Who Is Qualified to Sing?) 
 Sadācāra (Proper Conduct)
 Amāyā (Nonillusion)
 Prārthanā-rasa-vivṛti (Explanation of the Rasa of Prayers) 
 Pratibandhaka (Obstacles) 
 Bhāi sahajiyā (My Brother Sahajiyā) 
 Varṣa-śeṣa (Year’s End)

1917–18 
 Nava-varṣa (New Year) 
 Samālocanā (Critical Review) 
 Sajjana-krpālu (A Devotee Is Merciful) 
 Śakti-pariṇata jagat (The World as a Transformation of Potency)  
 Sajjana-akṛta-droha (A Devotee is Without Enemies)  
 Sajjana-satya-sāra (A Devotee is thoroughly Truthful) 
 Prākrt a śūdra vaisn a va nahe (A Materialistic Śūdra is not a Vaishnava)  
 Nāgarī-māṅgalya (Auspiciousness for a Coquette) 
 Sajjana-sama (A Devotee is Equipoised) 
 Sajjana-nirdośa (A Devotee is Faultless) 
 Sajjana-vadānya (A Devotee is Munificent) 
 Bhādatiyā bhakta nahe (A Hired Person Cannot Be a Devotee)  
 Sajjana-mṛdu (A Devotee Is Gentle) 
 Sajjana-akiñcana (A Devotee is without Possessions)  
 Sajjana-śuci (A Devotee is Clean) 
 Vaisnava darśana (Vaishnava Philosophy) 
 Varsa-śeṣa (Year’s End)

1918–19 
 Nava-varṣa (New Year) 
 Sajjana-sarvopakāraka (A Devotee Is Beneficial to All) 
 Sajjana-śānta (A Devotee Is Peaceful) 
 Gaura ki vastu? (What Is Gaura?) 
 Sajjana-kṛṣṇaika-śaraṇa (A Devotee Is Exclusively Surrendered to Krishna)  
 Sajjana-akāma (A Devotee Is Free Passion) 
 Sajjana-nirīha (A Devotee Is Harmless) 
 Sajjana-sthira (A Devotee Is Determined) 
 Sajjana-vijita-sad-guṇa (A Devotee Conquers the Six Bondages) 
 Śrī-mūrti o māyāvāda (The Image and the Doctrine of Māyāvāda) 
 Śrī Viśva-Vaiṣṇava-rāja-sabhā (The Royal World Vaishnava Association)  
 Sajjana-mita-bhuk (A Devotee Accepts Sense Objects in Moderation)  
 Bhaktisiddhānta (The Philosophical Conclusion of Bhakti)  
 Sajjana-apramatta (A Devotee Is Sane)

1919–20 
 Varṣodghāta (Ushering in the New Year) 
 Sajjana-mānada (A Devotee Honors Others) 
 Sajjana-amānī (A Devotee Undesirous of Respect)  
 Sajjana-gambhīra (A Devotee Is Solemn) 
 Sajjana-karuṇa (A Devotee Is Compassionate) 
 Sajjana-maitra (A Devotee Is Friendly) 
 Kāla-saṁjñāya nāma (The Sacred Names according to the Divisions of Time) 
 Śaukra o vṛttagata varṇa-bheda (Social Divisions according to One’s Own Nature and Birth) 
 Karmīra kanakādi (Gold and Other Assets of a Materialistic Worker)  
 Guru-dāsa (The Servant of the Guru) 
 Dīksita (The Initiated)

1920–21 
 Hāyanodghāta (Ushering in the New Year) 
 Aikāntika o vyabhicāra (Single-Mindedness and Deviation) 
 Nirjane anartha (Obstacles in Solitary Worship) (the poem Duṣṭa mana! tumi kiser vaiṣṇava?) 
 Sajjana-kavi (A Devotee Is Wise) 
 Cāturmāsya (The Four Months) 
 Pañcopāsanā (The System of Worshiping Five Images)  
 Vaiṣṇavera smṛti (The Smṛti Texts of the Vaishnavas)  
 Saṁskāra-sandarbha (A Treatise on Ritual Purification)  
 Sajjana-dakṣa (A Devotee Is Skilled)  
 Vaiṣṇava-maryādā (Appreciating Vaishnavas)  
 Sajjana-maunī (A Devotee Is Silent) 
 Yogapīṭhe śrī-mūrti-sevā (Serving the Image at Yogapīṭha)  
 Aprākrta (Nonmaterial)

1921–22 
 Nava-varṣa (New Year) 
 Saviśeṣa o nirviśeṣa (With and Without Particularity) 
 Meki o āsal (False and Real) 
 Smārta Raghunandana, article about the smārta Raghunandana
 Hari-nāma mahā-mantra (The Great Chant of the Names of Hari)  
 Mantropāsanā (Worship by Mantra) 
 Nisiddhācāra (Forbidden Conduct) 
 Śiksāṣṭakera-laghu-vivaraṇa (A Short Description of the Eight Instructions [by Caitanya])

Articles in the Gauḍīya

First Year (1922–23) 
 Śrī-kṛṣṇa-janma (The Birth of Shri Krishna) 
 Madhura lipi (Sweet Writing) 
 Loka-vicāra (Public Opinion) 
 Paramārtha (The Highest Aim) 
 Purāṇa-saṁvāda (The Message of the Purāṇas) 
 Nīti-bheda (Ethical Differences) 
 Ruci-bheda (Differences in Pleasure) 
 Śrī Jīva Gosvāmī (Jīva Goswami) 
 Gauḍīye prīti (Affection for the Gauḍīya) 
 Durgā-pūjā (Worship of Durgā) 
 Śarādīyā avāhana (Welcoming the Autumn) 
 Je dike bātās (Whichever Direction the Wind Blows) 
 Marūte secana (Planting a Seed in the Desert) 
 Smārtera kāṇḍa (The Vedic Literary Sections of the Smārtas)  
 Vicāra-ādālata (Court of Judgment) 
 Sevāpara nāma (A Positive Service Attitude to the Sacred Name) 
 Tridaṇḍi bhikṣu gīti (The Song of a Monk Holding the Triple Staff) 
 Śrī Madhva-janma-tithi (The Birthday of Shri Madhva) 
 Varṇāśrama (Varṇa and Ashrama) 
 Aprakata-tithi (Disappearance Day) 
 Vraje vānara (Monkeys in Vraja) 
 Cyuta-gotra (A Deviated Lineage) 
 Nṛ-mātrādhikāra (The Fundamental Right of Every Human Being)  
 Bhṛtaka-śrotā (A Hired Audience) 
 Vaiṣṇavao abhṛtaka (A Vaishnava Is Never Hired) 
 Dīkṣā-vidhāna (The Rules of Initiation) 
 Āsurika pravṛtti (Demonic Propensities) 
 Śrī Baladeva Vidyābhūṣaṇa, a brief biography of Baladeva Vidyānbhūṣaṇa  
 Sadācāra-smṛti (The Smrti Text for Proper Conduct), a discussion of Sadācāra-smṛti by Madhva Pañcarātra  
 Nigama o āgama (The Vedas and Related Sacred Texts)  
 Śrī Viśvanātha Cakravartī (Viśvanātha Cakravartī)  
 Vaiṣṇava darśana (Vaishnava Philosophy) 
 Varṇāntara (Changing Varṇa)  
 Paricaye praśna (A Question about Identity)  
 Asatye ādara (Fondness for Untruth)  
 Ayogya santāna (Unworthy Son)  
 Aśūdra dīkṣā (Initiation for Non-śūdras) 
 Pūjādhikāra (The Qualification to Perform Pūjā)  
 Anātma-jñāna (Knowledge of the Nonself)  
 Nija-paricaya (One’s Own Identity) 
 Vaṁśa-praṇālī (The System of Hereditary Lineages)  
 Gaura-bhajana (Worship of Gaura) 
 Dhānyā o śyāmā (Grains and Weeds) 
 Tṛtīya janma (Third Birth) 
 Avaidha sādhana (Illegitimate Practice)  
 Baija-brāhmaṇa (Hereditary Brāhmaṇa) 
 Pracāre bhrānti (Mistakes in Preaching)  
 Bhāgavata-śravaṇa (Hearing the Bhāgavata) 
 Maṭha ki? (What Is a Math?) 
 Āche adhikāra (There Is Qualification) 
 Śrīdhara Svāmī (Śrīdhara Svāmī) 
 Vyavahāra (Conduct) 
 Kamīnā (Scoundrel) 
 Śakti-sañcāra (Saving Potency) 
 Varṣa-parīkṣā (Yearly Examination) 
 Eka jāti (One Jāti) 
 Ihaloka paraloka (This World and the World Beyond)

Second Year (1923–24) 
 Varṣa-praveśa (Entering the New Year) 
 Brāhmaṇya-deva (The God of the Brāhmaṇas) 
 Guru-bruva (Imitation Gurus) 
 Kīrtane vijñāna (Realized Knowledge in Kīrtana)  
 Āvirbhāva-tithi (Appearance Day) 
 Maṭhera utsava (Festivals of the Maṭh) 
 Gosvāmī-pāda (The Respected Goswami) 
 Kṛṣṇe bhoga-buddhi (The Psychology of Enjoying Krishna)  
 Dīksita (The Initiated) 
 Gauḍīya bhajana-pranālī (The Process of Gauḍīya Worship)  
 Śrī-vigraha (The Image) 
 Jābāla-kathā (The Story of Jābāla) 
 Smārta o vaiṣṇava (Smārtas and Vaishnavas) 
 Sāmājika ahita (What Is Unbeneficial for Society) 
 Prākrta bhoktā ke? (Who Is the Real Enjoyer?) 
 Gaudīyera veśa (The Dress of the Gaudīyas)  
 Pratisambhāṣaṇa (Speech in Response) 
 Sūtra-vidveṣa (Enmity Expressed Tersely)

Third Year (1924–25) 
 Gauḍīya hāspātāla (Gauḍiya Hospital)  
 Bhāgavata-vivṛti (Explanation of Śrīmad-Bhāgavatam)  
 Śrī Kulaśekhara (Kulaśekhara) 
 Meyeli hinduwānī (Effeminate Hinduism)

Fourth Year (1925–26) 
 Madhura lipi (A Sweet Letter) 
 Aśrauta-darśana (Non-Vedic Philosophy) 
 Vedānta-tattva-sārer upodghāta (Introduction to the Vedānta-tattva-sāra)

Fifth Year (1926–27) 
 Darśane bhrānti (Error in Philosophy) 
 Vaiṣṇava-śrāddha (Vaishnava Funeral Rites) 
 Ālocakera ālocanā (A Critique of Critics) 
 Nyākābokāra svarūpa (The Real Nature of a Contemptible Fool)

Sixth Year (1927–28) 
 Māna-dāna o hāni (Offering Respect and Losing It) 
 Gauḍapura (The City of Gauḍa) 
 Āsala o nakala (Real and Fake) 
 Ahaituka dhāma-sevaka (An Unmotivated Servant of the Holy Places)  
 Sarva-pradhāna vivecanāra viśaya (The Most Important Thing to Consider)  
 Bhāi kutārkika (Brother Quibbler) 
 Kṛṣṇa-bhakta nirbodha nahen (A Bhakta of Krishna Is Not a Fool) 
 Prācīna Kuliyāy sahara Navadvīpa (The Town of Nabadwip Is Old Kuliya)  
 Kapatatā daridratāra mūla (The Cause of Poverty Is Cheating) 
 Ekaścandra (One Moon) 
 Puṇyāraṇya (A Sacred Forest) 
 Godāy galad (An Error in the Fundamentals) 
 Nīlācale Śrīmat Saccidānanda Bhaktivinoda (Bhaktivinoda in Jagannath Puri)

Seventh Year (1928–29) 
 Virakta jaghanya nahe (A Renunciant Is Not Contemptible) 
 Āmi ei nai, āmi sei (I Am Not This, I Am That) 
 Vyavasādārera kapaṭatā (The Merchants’ Cheating) 
 Haṁsajātira itihāsa (The History of the Descendens of the Swanlike)  
 Mantra-saṁskāra (The Purification of Mantra) 
 Bhoga o bhakti (Enjoyment and Bhakti) 
 Sunīti o durnīti (Good and Evil Policies) 
 Kṛṣṇa-tattva (The Truth about Krishna) 
 Śrīdhāma-vicāra (Examining a Sacred Pilgrimage)  
 Ekāyana-śruti o tad-vidhāna (The Ekāyana-Śruti and Its Regulations)  
 Pratīcye kārṣṇa sampradāya (The Lineage of Krishna in the West)  
 Pañcarātra (Pañcarātra) 
 Nīlācale Śrīmad Bhaktivinoda (Bhaktivinoda in Jagannath Puri)  
 Tīrtha Pāndarapura (The Holy Site of Pandarpur)  
 Māṇikya bhāskara (The Effulgent Manikyas), a praise of the Maharaja of Tripura  
 Vaiṣṇava-smṛti (Scriptures Giving Rules of Vaishnava Behavior) 
 Mahānta guru-tattva (The Truth about a Great Guru) 
 Boṣṭam pārlāmeṇṭ (Vaishnava Parliament)  
 Alaukika bhakta-caritra (The Unworldly Life and Deeds of a Bhakta)  
 Sumedhā-tithi (The Day Intelligent People Celebrate), about the anniversary of Bhaktivinoda

Eighth Year (1929–30) 
 Śrīdhāma Māyāpura kothāya? (Where Is the Sacred Site of Mayapur?)  
 Gaudācale Śrī Bhaktivinoda (Bhaktivinoda in Bengal) 
 Sātvata o asātvata (Devotees and Nondevotees) 
 Bhārata o paramārtha (India and the Highest Aim) 
 Paramārthera svarūpa (The Real Nature of Highest Aim) 
 Prācīna Kuliyāya dvārabhet (Entrance Fees in Old Kuliyā [Nabadwip])  
 Śikṣaka o śikṣita (The Teacher and the One Being Taught) 
 Viṣayīra Kṛṣṇa-prema (The Materialists’s Love for Krishna) 
 Āśramera veśa (Appropriate Dress for the Ashram)

Ninth Year (1930–31) 
 Śrī-bhakti-mārga (The Path of Bhakti) 
 Bhava-rogīra hāsapātāla (A Hospital for the Materially Diseased)  
 Jagabhandhura Kṛṣṇānuśīlana (The Practice of Krishna-Bhakti of Jagabandhu)

Tenth Year (1931–32) 
 Gauḍīya mahimā (The Excellence of the Gaudīya) 
 Sat-śikṣārthir vivecya (What a Student of the Truth Ought to Analyze)  
 Nimba-bhāskara (Nimbarka) 
 Ajña o vijñera narma-kathā (Playful Talks between an Ignorant and a Wise Man)  
 Vaiṣṇava-vaṁśa (The Vaishnava Clan) 
 Kanphucor vicāra (The Deliberations of Confucius)

Eleventh Year (1932–33) 
 Ekādaśa prārambhikā (Beginning the Eleventh Year) 
 Vaiṣṇave jāti-buddhi (Considering a Vaishnava to Belong to a Particular Jāti)  
 Mādhukara bhaikṣya (What Should Be Begged from Door to Door)  
 Duṣṭi-vaiklavya (Distress from Corruption)  
 Āmāra kathā (My Message) 
 Sat-śikṣā pradarśanī (The Exhibition of Religious Education) 
 Kṛṣṇa bhakti-i śoka-kāma-jādyāpahā (Devotion to Krishna is the Exclusive Way to Transcend Lamentation and Desire) 
 Kṛṣṇe matirastu (May Your Resolution Be Toward Krishna)

Twelfth Year (1933–34) 
 Kṛpāśīrvāda (Merciful Blessings)

Thirteenth Year (1934–1935) 
 Sva-para-maṅgala (Auspiciousness for Oneself and Others) 
 Vaikuṇṭha o guṇa-jāta jagat (Vaikuṇṭha and the World Born of Three Guṇas)  
 Bhogavāda o bhakti (The Philosophy of Hedonism and Bhakti)

Fourteenth Year (1935–36) 
 Nava-varṣa (New Year) 
 ‘Baḍa āmi’ o ‘Bhālo āmi’ (I’m Great and I’m Good)  
 Tadvana (That Forest) 
 Vāstava-vastu (The Real Essence)

Fifteenth Year (1936–37) 
 Hāyanodghāta (Ushering in the New Year)

References

 
 

Hindu texts
Bibliographies by writer
Bibliographies of Indian writers
Religious bibliographies